Skylab 2 (also SL-2 and SLM-1) was the first crewed mission to Skylab, the first American orbital space station. The mission was launched on an Apollo command and service module by a Saturn IB rocket on May 25, 1973, and carried NASA astronauts Pete Conrad, Joseph P. Kerwin, Paul J. Weitz to the station. The name Skylab 2 also refers to the vehicle used for that mission. The Skylab 2 mission established a twenty-eight-day record for human spaceflight duration. Furthermore, its crew were the first space station occupants ever to return safely to Earth – the only previous space station occupants, the crew of the 1971 Soyuz 11 mission that had crewed the Salyut 1 station for twenty-four days, died upon reentry due to unexpected cabin depressurization.

The crewed Skylab missions were officially designated Skylab 2, 3, and 4. Miscommunication about the numbering resulted in the mission emblems reading "Skylab I", "Skylab II", and "Skylab 3" respectively.

Crew

Kerwin became the first medical doctor in space. NASA chose a doctor as the first Skylab scientist to better understand the effect of spaceflight on the human body during a long-duration mission.

Backup crew

Support crew
Robert L. Crippen
Henry W. Hartsfield, Jr
William E. Thornton
Richard H. Truly

Mission parameters

Mass: 19,979 kg  
Maximum altitude: 440 km
Distance:  18,536,730.9 km
Launch vehicle: Saturn IB
Perigee: 428 km
Apogee: 438 km
Inclination: 50°
Period: 93.2 min
Soft dock: May 26, 1973 – 09:56 UTC
Undocked: May 26, 1973 – 10:45 UTC
Time docked: 49 minutes
Hard dock: May 26, 1973 – 15:50 UTC
Undocked: June 22, 1973 – 08:58 UTC
Time docked: 26 days, 17 hours, 2 minutes

Space walks
Weitz — EVA 1 (stand up EVA — CM side hatch)
Start: May 26, 1973, 00:40 UTC
End: May 26, 01:20 UTC
Duration: 40 minutes
Conrad and Kerwin — EVA 2
Start: June 7, 1973, 15:15 UTC
End: June 7, 18:40 UTC
Duration: 3 hours, 25 minutes
Conrad and Weitz — EVA 3
Start: June 19, 1973, 10:55 UTC
End: June 19, 12:31 UTC
Duration: 1 hour, 36 minutes

Mission highlights

The Skylab station suffered significant damage on its May 14 launch: its micrometeorite shield, and one of its primary solar arrays had torn loose during launch, and the remaining primary solar array was jammed. Without the shield which was designed to also provide thermal protection, Skylab baked in the Sun, and rising temperatures inside the workshop released toxic materials into the station's atmosphere and endangered on-board film and food. The first crew was supposed to launch on May 15, but instead had to train practicing repair techniques as they were developed by the engineers. Ground controllers purged the atmosphere with pure nitrogen four times, before refilling it with the nitrogen/oxygen atmosphere for the crew. The secret National Reconnaissance Office used a KH-8 Gambit 3 to photograph the damaged station.

On May 25, Skylab 2 lifted from LC-39B, the first Saturn IB launch in almost five years and only the second-ever launch from Pad 39B. Booster performance was nominal except for one momentary glitch that could have threatened the mission – when the Commit signal was sent to the Saturn at ignition, the instrument unit sent a command to switch the launch vehicle from internal to external power. This would have shut down the Saturn's electrical system, but not the propulsion system, and likely cause the disaster scenario of an uncontrollable booster, requiring the Launch Escape System to be activated and the Command Module pulled away to safety, followed by Range Safety destroying the errant launch vehicle. However, the duration of the cutoff signal was less than one second, too short a time for the electrical relay in the booster to be activated, thus nothing happened and the launch proceeded as planned. This glitch was traced to a modification of the pad electrical equipment and corrective steps were subsequently taken to prevent it from happening again. On reaching the station, Conrad flew their Apollo Command/Service Module (CSM) around it to inspect the damage, then soft-docked with it to avoid the necessity of station keeping while the crew ate, and flight controllers planned the first repair attempt. Then they undocked so that Conrad could position the CSM by the jammed solar panel, so that Weitz could perform a stand-up EVA, trying to free the array by tugging at it with a 10-foot hooked pole, while Kerwin held onto his legs. This failed, and consumed a significant amount of the Skylab's nitrogen maneuvering fuel to keep it steady in the process.

The crew then attempted to perform the hard dock to Skylab, but the capture latches failed to operate. After eight failed attempts, they donned their pressure suits again and partially dis-assembled the CSM's docking probe; the next attempt worked. Once inside the station, the crew deployed a collapsible parasol through the small scientific airlock to act as a sunshade. (This approach was suggested and designed by NASA's "Mr. Fix It" Jack Kinzler, who was awarded the NASA Distinguished Service Medal for the effort.)  Successful deployment of the sunshade dropped inside temperatures to sustainable levels.

Two weeks later, Conrad and Kerwin performed a second EVA, finally freeing the stuck solar panel and increasing the electrical power to the workshop. They had prepared for this repair by practicing in the Neutral Buoyancy Simulator at the Marshall Space Flight Center. Without power from the panel, the second and third Skylab missions would have been unable to perform their main experiments, and the station's critical battery system would have been seriously degraded. During this EVA, the sudden deployment of the solar panel structure caused both astronauts to be flung from the station's hull, testing their nerves as well as the strength of their safety tethers. After recovering their composure, both astronauts returned to their positions on the station and completed the EVA.

For nearly a month they made further repairs to the workshop, conducted medical experiments, gathered solar and Earth science data, and performed a total of 392 hours of experiments. The mission tracked two minutes of a large solar flare with the Apollo Telescope Mount; they took and returned some 29,000 frames of film of the sun. The Skylab 2 astronauts spent 28 days in space, which doubled the previous U.S. record. The mission ended successfully on June 22, 1973, when Skylab 2 splashed down in the Pacific Ocean 9.6 km from the recovery ship USS Ticonderoga. Skylab 2 set the records for the longest duration crewed spaceflight, greatest distance traveled and greatest mass docked in space. Conrad set the record for most time in space for an astronaut.

Mission insignia
The Skylab 1 patch was designed by Kelly Freas, a well-known artist highly regarded in the science fiction community, who was suggested to NASA by science fiction author and editor Ben Bova. The insignia features Skylab above the earth with the sun in the background. In an article for Analog Science Fiction/Science Fact magazine, Freas said, "Among the suggestions the astronauts had made was the idea of a solar eclipse as seen from Skylab. It soon became clear that this idea would solve several problems at once: it pointed up the solar study function of Skylab, it would give me the large circular shape of the Earth as counterpoint to the angularity of the cluster, and it would establish firmly the connection of Skylab to the Earth. In addition, it would give a chance to get the necessary high contrast for good visibility of the tiny finished patch. ... I made several studies of cloud patterns on the planet, reducing them finally to very conventionalized swirls. The Skylab cluster was simplified and simplified again, till it became simply a black form with a white edgelight to set it off."

Gallery

Spacecraft location
The Skylab 2 command module is displayed at the National Museum of Naval Aviation, Pensacola, Florida.

See also
 Extra-vehicular activity
 List of spacewalks
 Splashdown
Timeline of longest spaceflights

References

External links

 Skylab: Command service module systems handbook, CSM 116 – 119 (PDF) April 1972
 Skylab Saturn 1B flight manual (PDF) September 1972
 NASA Skylab Chronology
 Marshall Space Flight Center Skylab Summary
 Skylab 2 Characteristics SP-4012 NASA HISTORICAL DATA BOOK
 Analog interview with Frank Kelly Freas

Multimedia

 Onboard flight film from the Skylab 2 mission

1973 in spaceflight
Extravehicular activity
Human spaceflights
Skylab program
Spacecraft launched in 1973
Spacecraft which reentered in 1973
Spacecraft launched by Saturn rockets
Pete Conrad